Route 308 is a collector road in the Canadian province of Nova Scotia.

It is located in Yarmouth County and connects Morris Island with East Quinan.

The many Acadian communities along the road inspired the name of an Acadian restaurant in Haifax, "308 South".

Communities
Morris Island
Surette's Island
Amiraults Hill
Tusket (Hubbard's Point - Tusket - Belleville North)
Bell Neck
Quinan (Springhaven - Quinan - East Quinan)

See also
List of Nova Scotia provincial highways

References

Nova Scotia provincial highways
Roads in Yarmouth County